The City of the Sun is a philosophical work by the Italian Dominican philosopher Tommaso Campanella. It is an important early utopian work. The work was written in Italian in 1602, shortly after Campanella's imprisonment for heresy and sedition. A Latin version was written in 1613–14 and published in Frankfurt in 1623.

Synopsis 

The book is presented as a dialogue between "a Grandmaster of the Knights Hospitaller and a Genoese Sea-Captain". Inspired by Plato's Republic and the description of Atlantis in Timaeus, it describes a theocratic society where goods, women and children are held in common. It also resembles the City of Adocentyn in the Picatrix, an Arabic grimoire of astrological magic. In the final part of the work, Campanella prophesies—in the veiled language of astrology—that the Spanish kings, in alliance with the Pope, are destined to be the instruments of a Divine Plan: the final victory of the True Faith and its diffusion in the whole world. While one could argue that Campanella was simply thinking of the conquest of the New World, it seems that this prophecy should be interpreted in the light of a work written shortly before The City of the Sun, The Monarchy in Spain, in which Campanella exposes his vision of a unified, peaceful world governed by a theocratic monarchy.

The City 
Protected and defended by seven circles of walls, constructed of palaces that serve as dwellings for the citizens, the city is located in a place with an ideal climate, conducive to physical health, and on the slope of a hillside because the air there is lighter and purer. One of the most significant aspects of this community is the distribution of work. Once again Campanella engages in an explicit polemic with Aristotle, who had excluded artisans, peasants and those involved in manual labor from the category of full citizenship and from the highest levels of virtue.

In the City of the Sun no occupation is vile or base, and all are of equal dignity—in fact, those workers who are required to expend greater effort, such as artisans and builders, receive more praise. Everyone must be acquainted with all lines of work, and then each person practices the one for which he shows the greatest aptitude. They have no servants, and no service is regarded as unworthy. The only thing that they consider to be despicable is idleness, and in this way they come to privilege the dignity of work and to overturn an absurd conception of nobility, linked to inactivity and vice.

Thanks to the equal division of labour, it is sufficient for each person to spend only four hours a day working; but it is essential that they all work, because the idleness of one would have repercussions on the profit and the effort of the others. The citizens possess nothing; instead, everything is held in common, from food to houses, from the acquisition of knowledge to the exercise of activities, from honors to amusements, from women to children.

There are “officials” in charge of the distribution of each thing, who keep an eye out and make sure that this happens justly, but no one can appropriate anything for himself. According to them, possession of a house or a family reinforces “self-love”, with all the dire consequences this generates. They live “like philosophers in common” because they are aware of the negative impact, not only on the social but also on the moral level, of an unequal distribution of goods.

One of the most spectacular and imaginative aspects of The City of the Sun, which immediately struck its readers, are the painted walls of the city. Apart from enclosing and protecting the city, the walls are also the curtains of an extraordinary theater and the pages of an illustrated encyclopedia of knowledge. The walls of the palaces are painted with images of all the arts and sciences.

Starting with the wall that holds up the columns of the temple and gradually descending in large circles, following the order of the planets from Mercury to Saturn, we encounter illustrations of the heavens and the stars, of mathematical figures, of every country on earth and of all the marvels and secrets of the mineral, vegetable and animal worlds, until we arrive at mankind: on the internal wall of the sixth circle the mechanical arts and their inventors are represented.

Campanella was greatly interested in all ingenious discoveries, and in The City of the Sun he provides many examples of curious inventions, such as vessels able to navigate without wind and without sails, and stirrups that make it possible to guide a horse using only one's feet, leaving one's hands free. On the external wall legislators are depicted; and it is here, in “a place of great honor”—but along with Moses, Osiris, Jove, Mercury and Muhammad—that the Genoese sailor recognizes Christ and the twelve apostles. Knowledge is not enclosed in books kept in separate places such as libraries but is openly on show to everyone's eyes. Visualizing in this manner promotes a quicker, easier and more efficient form of learning, in that it is connected to the art of memory, which underlines the evocative and emotive power of images. From a tender age children run around in this theater of knowledge, appropriately guided and following correct itineraries, so that they learn joyously, as if playing a game, without effort or pain.

In addition to the community of goods and the painted walls, another characteristic feature of the City of the Sun, one that is more difficult and disconcerting and that Campanella himself describes as “hard and arduous”, is the community of wives. This is the solution adopted by the citizens to the problem of generation. Echoing the teaching of the Pythagorean Ocellus Lucanus, Campanella says that they are amazed that humans are preoccupied by the breeding of horses and dogs while neglecting their own. The act of generation entails a large responsibility of the part of the parents; and if it is exercised in an incorrect manner, it can give rise to a long chain of suffering.

Moreover, there is a close connection between a person's natural “complexion” or character, which is inborn and not afterwards modifiable, and moral virtue, which needs a suitable terrain in order to take root and prosper. Generation should therefore respect precise norms and not be entrusted to chance nor to individual sentiments. The citizens distinguish between love and sex. Affection between men and women, based on friendship and respect more than sexual attraction, is expressed in acts that are far removed from sexuality, such as exchanges of gifts, conversation and dancing. Sexual generation, on the other hand, must obey strict rules regarding the physical and moral qualities of the parents and the choice of a propitious time for conception, determined by an astrologer. Such a union is not the expression of a personal, emotional or passionate relationship, but rather is connected to the social responsibility of generation and to love for the collective community.

The religious beliefs of the citizenry, even though they include fundamental principles of Christianity (such as the immortality of the soul and divine providence), form a natural religion that establishes a sort of osmosis between the city and the stars. The temple is open and not surrounded by walls. In one of his poems Campanella promises:  “I shall make the heavens a temple and the stars an altar”. On the vault of the temple's dome the stars are depicted together with their influence on earthly affairs. The altar, on which are placed a celestial and a terrestrial globe, is in the form of the sun. Prayers are directed toward the heavens. The task of the twenty-four priests, who live in cells located in the highest part of the temple, is to observe the stars and, using astronomical instruments, to take account of all their movements. It is their job to indicate the times most favorable for generation and for agricultural labors, acting in this way as intermediaries between God and human beings.

Trento 1602 manuscript 

In Trento's Civic Library, there is kept a 1602 manuscript of The City of the Sun (shelf mark BCT1-1538), discovered in 1943 by Italian historian Luigi Firpo. It is considered the most ancient manuscript copy that has survived to the present time. The text arrived at the Library through the bequest of Baron Antonio Mazzetti :it:Antonio Mazzetti's (1781–1841). He was a book collector and bibliophile and, as written in his will, he donated his book heritage to the Civic Library.

The manuscript was restored in 1980. It is made of parchment tied on paperboard. It consists of two codicological unities joined together years after their writing: the first is a Venetian historical chronicle from 1297 to 1582, followed by a list of "Hospedali di Venezia" ("Hospitals in Venice"). At the bottom, it is sewn to a small-sized booklet independently enumerated: it is a copy by an anonymous hand of The City of the Sun. The transcription is meticulous, and there only are a few insignificant mistakes.

See also 

New Atlantis
Communism
Ideal city
Iambulus

References

Sources 
Le poesie, ed. F. Giancotti (Turin: Einaudi, 1998; new ed. Milan: Bompiani, 2013; English translation by Sherry Roush in two parts: Selected Philosophical Poems, Chicago and London: University of Chicago Press, 2011; Pisa and Rome: Fabrizio Serra, 2011).

External links 

 
 
 from "La città del sole": "Tutte le cose son communi" on audio MP3
 Ernst, Germana, "Tommaso Campanella", The Stanford Encyclopedia of Philosophy (Fall 2010 Edition), Edward N. Zalta (ed.).

1602 books
1600s science fiction novels
Utopian theory
Utopian novels
Political philosophy literature
Theocracy
Astrological texts
Monarchy in fiction